Renaud (or Reginald) (died 973), brother of Count Werner. According to Eduard Hlawitschka (de) they were probably members of the so-called "Matfried" noble clan (de).

Upon the death of Richer, Count of Mons in 972, who was possibly their brother, Renaud and his brother Werner defended Mons from the brothers Reginar IV and Lambert I.

Returning from exile in 973, the sons of Reginar III, Reginar IV, Count of Mons, and Lambert I, Count of Louvain, killed both Renaud and his brother Werner at the battle of Peronne.

References

Sources 
 Vanderkindere, L,. Régnier IV, Académie royale de Belgique, Biographie nationale, vol. 19, Bruxelles, 1907
 Warner, David A. (Translator), Ottonian Germany: The Chronicon of Thiermar of Merseburg, Manchester University Press, Manchester, 2001

External links
 Medieval Lands Project, Grafen von Zulpich

European nobility
Counts of Mons